Mohammed Ashraf Ghori (born 17 September 1973), is a Dubai-based Indian comic book artist, filmmaker and entrepreneur. He is best known for creating UAE's first CGI science fiction film Xero Error  a futuristic cyborg thriller which was shown at the 63rd Cannes Film Festival. and as the artist behind UAE's acclaimed Arabic Graphic Novel Antara. He is the CEO and founder of digital design agency Xpanse CGI.

Early life and professional career

Ghori moved from Hyderabad, India to Dubai, UAE at the age of 2. His first professional work appeared in the pages of magazines published by Khaleej Times. He was a regular illustrator for Young Times from 1989 until 2001. Ghori graduated from the University of Houston, Texas in 1994.

Ghori was on the judges panel for the Kuwait Arab Advertising Awards for the years 2006 and 2007.

In 2007, he founded digital creative agency Xpanse CGI in Dubai and started independent film-making with Xero Error in 2008. Xero Error premiered at the 3rd Gulf Film Festival and also played at the 63rd Cannes Film Festival and the 10th edition of Sci-Fi-London. In 2010, Ghori was the Art Director for the first Indo-Emirati film 'Malal'. He worked as Senior Digital Artist at Bayyinah TV from 2016 to 2017. Ghori received the UAE Golden Visa in 2022 in recognition of his creative achievements in the country.

Artist 

Ghori has produced work for comic book publishers including Dark Horse Comics and IDW Publishing. 

San Jacinto College in Pasadena Texas had organized a Comic Art Exhibit of Ghori's works in 1993. In 1994, Ghori was a founding member of Tempest Comics in Houston, Texas, and produced a 4-issue mini series 'Tempest Comics Presents'. He was a featured comic artist at Dallas Fantasy Fair, 1994 (Dallas, Texas).

In April 2012, Ghori was a featured guest, along with Alvin Lee, Lee Townsend and Yishan Li at the first MEFCC - Middle East Film and Comic Con in Dubai, UAE, and at the Middle East's inaugural IGN Convention in July 2013. In 2013 Ghori was a contributing artist for Dark Horse Comics in collaboration with writer Alex De Campi.

In 2015 Ghori collaborated with Arab rapper Narcy_(rapper) to create a mixed-media project called World War Free Now which combined music, video, and comics together. A limited edition comic was released as a companion piece to Narcy's album.  In 2018 his work on Arabic graphic novel 'Antara' received critical acclaim as 'An Experiment Worthy of Praise' citing 'the versatility and sheer genius of the artist'.

In 2023, Ghori was named as the Arts Ambassador for The Metaverse Arts Museum.

Social media influencer 

Ghori is ranked as a prominent social media influencer in the UAE. From 2011 to 2014, Ghori was the featured art influencer for Samsung's Note series.  In April 2014 Ghori was the social media ambassador for Ford Middle East's 'Stand Out' campaign for the MENA region and again in 2015 to promote The Ford Mustang 2016 in the #ExperienceFord Social Media Campaign. In April 2016, he was the face of Microsoft's #DoGreatThingsDXB Campaign to promote Windows 10 and launch Microsoft Surface Pro 4 in the Gulf.

He is a frequent speaker at events related to design, film and entrepreneurship in the UAE.

Awards 

 World Economic Forum – Excellence Award, 2015
 Digital Studio Awards – Best up and coming filmmaker, 2011
 Made in UAE Awards – Distinguished Achievement Award, 2011

Filmography 

2023 Baab (Feature Film) - Concept Artist, Creature Designer
2022 Desert Warrior (Feature Film) - Concept Artist
2012 Djinn (Feature Film) - Concept Artist
2010 Levity – Xero Error Minus1 (08:00, Digital Animated Film) - Writer, Director, Producer
2010 Malal (Short Film) – Art Director, Associate Producer (Xpanse CGI)
2009 City of Life (Feature Film) – Graphic Designer
2006 Arabana (Short Film) – Associate Producer

References

External links 
 
 Xpanse CGI website
 
 Metaverse Arts Museum website
 FOBcity comics site

Indian film directors
Living people
Indian emigrants to the United Arab Emirates
People from Dubai
1973 births
Indian comics artists
Social media influencers
Emirati philanthropists
Indian_expatriates_in_the_United_Arab_Emirates
21st-century Indian male artists
Emirati artists
Emirati film directors